Darragh Morgan (Belfast, 1974) is an Irish violinist.   

Darragh has established himself as a soloist of new music giving numerous recitals at Sonorities Festival , as well as in Prague, Malta, Nicosia, Hong Kong, South Korea, Italy, Switzerland, the Netherlands, the United States, throughout the UK, and Ireland.

Darragh has recently joined The Smith Quartet, is currently a member of the new music collective Noszferatu and Artistic Director of Music at Drumcliffe, a chamber music festival in the west of Ireland. He also plays with the piano trio The Fidelio Trio.

Darragh regularly performs at international festivals including Warsaw Autumn, Ars Musica Brussels, Darmstadt, Aldeburgh, Spitalfields, Cheltenham, OCM, Dubrovnik Summer Festival, New Music Evenings Bratislava, BBC Proms Chamber Music, National Arts Festival Grahamstown, South Africa, Cutting Edge London, Festival D'Automne Paris, Besançon Festival de Musique, Lucerne Festival, and Jazz sous les Pommiers, Coutance.

Darragh has performed with many of the world's contemporary music groups including Ensemble Modern, London Sinfonietta, Musik Fabrik, Icebreaker, Birmingham Contemporary Music Group, Remix Ensemble, Jane's Minstrels and Topologies. Darragh broadcasts regularly for BBC Radio 3, has been chosen as BBC Radio 4's Pick of the Week and also appeared on The South Bank Show, SABC, CYBC, RTHK, WDR and RTÉ lyric fm.  He appears regularly as soloist with The Ulster Orchestra most recently in the world premiere of Sir John Tavener's Hymn of Dawn.

From 1999-2001 Darragh was leader of the Cyprus State Orchestra and throughout 2004 was Concertmaster of the KZN Philharmonic in Durban, South Africa. During that year he also became Director of Baroque 2000 South Africa's acclaimed period instrument orchestra. He also regularly leads English Touring Opera, and was featured as leader of the orchestra in BBC 2's acclaimed TV series 'The Genius of Beethoven'.

The Fidelio Trio recently gave the European premiere of Michael Nyman's The Photography of Chance. Darragh is a faculty member of Apple Hill Chamber Music, New Hampshire, USA, regularly coaches at the Britten-Pears Young Artists Programme and has worked closely with The Mostar Sinfonietta, Bosnia and given workshops for Buskaid in Soweto. He regularly gives lecture-recitals on extended violin techniques recently at Queen's University Belfast, Trinity College Dublin and King's College London. Darragh teaches at Goldsmiths College, University of London, and was recently appointed 'Musician in Residence' at the University of Ulster.

He has worked with a diverse range of international artists such as Travis, Paul McCartney, The Divine Comedy, David Bowie, The Spice Girls, The Corrs, Jamiroquai, Yvonne Chaka Chaka, Incognito, The Lemon Heads and Brian Kennedy. In the world of Irish Traditional Music Darragh has worked closely with Mícheál Ó Súilleabháin, Nóirín Ní Riain and Derek Bell of The Chieftains.

Darragh Morgan currently resides, with his wife, pianist Mary Dullea, and their children in south east London.

External links
Official website
Smith Quartet website
Fidelio Trio website

1974 births
Living people
Academics of Goldsmiths, University of London
People associated with Ulster University
Musicians from Belfast
Violinists from Northern Ireland
British male violinists
21st-century violinists
21st-century male musicians